F-19 is the designation for a hypothetical US fighter aircraft that has never been officially acknowledged, and has engendered much speculation that it might refer to a type of aircraft whose existence is still classified.

History
Since the unification of the numbering system in 1962, U.S. fighters have been designated by consecutive numbers, beginning with the F-1 Fury. F-13 was never assigned to a fighter due to triskaidekaphobia, though the designation had previously been used for a reconnaissance version of the B-29. After the F/A-18 Hornet, the next announced aircraft was the YF-20 Tigershark. The USAF proposed the F-19 designation for the fighter, but Northrop requested the "F-20" instead. The USAF finally approved the F-20 designation in 1982.  The truth behind this jump in numbers is Northrop pressed the designation "YF-20" as they wanted an even number, in order to stand out from the Soviet odd-numbered designations. Despite this, the designations YF-17 and YF-23 were not skipped (although YF-20, YF-17 and YF-23 all were prototypes and did not enter production phase).

The United States received the first Lockheed F-117 Nighthawk stealth fighter in 1982. During the decade many news articles discussed what they called the "F-19". The Testor Corporation produced a F-19 scale model. The company had decades of experience in producing highly detailed models that pilots and aerospace engineers purchased, and used its sources in the United States military and defense contractors. The CBS Evening News  with Dan Rather and other media discussed the model after its January 1986 introduction; when the real stealth aircraft crashed in California in July 1986, news stories used the model to depict it. Representative Ron Wyden asked the chairman of Lockheed Corporation why an aircraft that Congressmen could not see was sold as model aircraft. The publicity helped to make the model the best-selling model aircraft of all time, but it did not really resemble the F-117, which no doubt pleased those working with the real, secret aircraft. The F-117 designation was publicly revealed with the actual aircraft in November 1988.

Notable appearances in media
 In 1986, the Testor Corporation released a model aircraft kit, calling it the "F-19 Stealth Fighter". The kit is claimed to be the best-selling plastic model kit of all time.
 Like the Testor Corporation, Monogram models also released the "F-19A Specter" which was based on the design by Loral Inc.
 In his 1986 novel Red Storm Rising, Tom Clancy featured the "F-19A Ghostrider" (nicknamed "Frisbee" by the pilots and crew) as a secret weapon used to combat a Soviet invasion of Germany. 
 An F-19 was the alternate mode of the Decepticon character Whisper in Marvel Comics' Transformers comic book series during the Transformers: Generation 1 era.
 The Toyline Ring Raiders, produced by Matchbox, made extensive use of the F19 and F19A on multiple occasions. The main hero Victor Vector flew a personal F19 named Victory 1! The antagonistic pilot Cutthroat used a F19A with the designation Bayonet. In the so called "Wing Packs", in which every main pilot got his own squadron, F19 and F19A fighters were part of many sets.
 The Testors F-19 appears briefly in the animated opening for the TV show Beyond 2000.
 Jane's Information Group published an incorrect entry on the F-19 in their aviation reference, Jane's All the World's Aircraft 1986–1987. In addition to the fictitious artwork, the 1987–1988 and 1988–89 editions lists the aircraft as the "Lockheed 'RF-19 and "XST".
 An F-19 appears in Dan Dare as a Mark Two Stealth low profile penetrator, flown at Space Fleet's annual aerospace show by Colonel Dan Dare and nicknamed a "mud mover" by Digby. A modified "F-19" design with a retrofuturistic cockpit is also seen used as part of an airframe crash test demonstration at the show.
 MicroProse released the 1987 video game Project Stealth Fighter and the successor 1988/1990 game F-19 Stealth Fighter, both featuring an imagining of the F-19's capabilities, with artwork based on the Testor Corporation model kit.
 In 1988, an F-19 was released in the G.I. Joe toy line, called the "X-19 Phantom".  Included was a pilot codenamed Ghostrider.  The G.I. Joe: A Real American Hero toy the "Phantom X-19" was loosely based on the Testor model.
 The 1990 videogame Air Diver featured an "F-119D Stealth Fighter" that strongly resembled the Monogram F-19 model.
The 1989 video game David Wolf: Secret Agent involves the disappearance of the SF-2a "Shadowcat" stealth fighter, whose appearance was loosely based on the Testor model. The same happens in the 1990 game Operation Stealth.

See also

References

External links
 Non-Standard DOD Aircraft Designations: Lockheed Martin F-117 Nighthawk
 "Missing" USAF/DOD Aircraft Designations

Fictional aircraft
Stealth aircraft